The Hammer / Palmer Mansion is a historic mansion at 3654-3656 S. Dr. Martin Luther King Jr. Drive in the Bronzeville section of Chicago.

It was designed by William Wilson Clay of the firm Wheelock and Clay (Otis Leonard Wheelock) in the Queen Anne style and built in 1885. It is considered endangered.

It was built for and home to justice D. Harry Palmer. It was also home to Lu Palmer and her husband. Obsidian House proposed renovating it opening it as a home for its collection on Black journalists. The organization secured a $1.25 million loan to purchase the property in 2021.

References

Houses in Chicago
Houses completed in 1885
Queen Anne architecture in Illinois